The 2010 NACRA Women's Rugby Championship was the first tournament hosted by the Bahamas. It was a significant departure from previous events, which had featured only teams from English-speaking West Indies. For the first time, USA and Canada sent their U20 teams - however, again financial problems restricted the participation of most island teams, with the exception of the Cayman Islands. The result was a three-way NACRA tournament. The Caymans also played hosts The Bahamas for the Caribbean title.

A Caribbean Select XV (with players coming from Trinidad & Tobago (T&T), Guyana, Jamaica, Barbados, British Virgin Islands, and St Vincent and The Grenadines) also played non-tournament games against the USA, Canada and Bahamas.

The tournament took place at the Winton Rugby Centre, Nassau, from 15–21 August. Canada U20 defeated USA U20 6–3 to win the Championship.

Table

Results

Caribbean Championship 
Following the NACRA tournament, the two individual Caribbean entrants played off for the Caribbean title. Cayman Islands secured their first Caribbean Championship with a comfortable win. Two early tries from centre Lolitta Hanna provided Cayman with an early 10 point lead and further tries from Lisa Bird and Emily Davies and a katie Bayles conversion gave Cayman a commanding 22-0 half time lead. Second tries for Bird and Hanna and one each for Kehoe and Lawrence with Bayles adding 3 more conversion rounded off Cayman's 48-0 victory.

Notes

References 

Women's rugby union competitions for national teams
Rugby union competitions in North America
Rugby union competitions in the Caribbean
Women's rugby union in North America